Marie-Christine is a given name. Notable people with the name include:

Marie-Christine Adam (born 1950), French actress
Marie-Christine Arnautu (born 1952), French Member of the European Parliament for the National Front
Marie Christine of Austria, Duchess of Teschen (1742–1798), fifth child of Maria Theresa of Austria and Francis I, Holy Roman Emperor
Marie-Christine Barrault (born 1944), French actress who has appeared in over forty feature films
Princess Marie-Christine of Belgium (born 1951), member of the Belgian Royal Family
Marie Christine Björn (1763–1837), Danish ballerina and actor
Marie-Christine Blandin (born 1952), member of the Senate of France, representing the Nord department
Marie Christine of Savoy, Blessed (1812–1836), the first Queen consort of Ferdinand II of the Two Sicilies
Marie Christine de Bourbon (1806–1878), Queen consort of Spain (1829 to 1833) and Regent of Spain (1833 to 1840)
Marie-Christine Brignole (1737–1813), the daughter of a Genovese nobleman
Marie-Christine Cazier (born 1963), retired French sprinter, who specialized in the 200 meters
Marie Christine Chilver (1920–2007), also known by the codename Agent Fifi, British secret agent in World War II
Marie-Christine Dalloz (born 1958), member of the National Assembly of France
Marie-Christine Deurbroeck (born 1957), retired female long-distance runner from Belgium
Marie-Christine Gessinger (1992–2010), Austrian fashion model who died in a car accident at the age of 17
Marie Christine de Pardaillan de Gondrin (1663–1675), daughter of Françoise de Rochechouart de Mortemart and the Marquis of Montespan
Marie Christine Anna Agnes Hedwig Ida (Princess Michael of Kent) (born 1945), member of the British Royal Family
Marie Christine Kohler (1876–1943), member of the Kohler family of Wisconsin, well known for her philanthropic deeds
Marie-Christine Koundja (born 1957), Chadian writer and diplomat
Marie-Christine de Lalaing, daughter of Count Charles II of Lalaing and Marie de Montmorency-Nivelle
Marie Christine Felizitas of Leiningen-Dagsburg-Falkenburg-Heidesheim (1692–1734), German noblewoman member of the House of Leiningen
Marie-Christine Lombard (born 1958), French business executive
Marie-Christine Schmidt (born 1986), Canadian sprint kayaker
Marie Christine Schneider (1952–2011), French actress, known as Maria Schneider
Marie-Christine Vergiat (born 1956), community organizations' activist and a French politician

See also
Marie Christine, a musical written by Michael John LaChiusa

fr:Marie-Christine